Big Run is the name of several unincorporated communities in the U.S. state of West Virginia.

Big Run, Marion County, West Virginia
Big Run, Marshall County, West Virginia
Big Run, Webster County, West Virginia
Big Run, Wetzel County, West Virginia